Dolores Recordings is a Swedish record label owned by Telegram Studios, whose roster includes I'm from Barcelona, Swingfly, Caesars, and some releases by The Soundtrack of Our Lives and Dungen.

In May 2021, Dolores was acquired by Round Hill Music.

See also
 List of record labels

References

External links
Official site

Swedish record labels
Indie rock record labels
Rock record labels